Hexham is a constituency in Northumberland represented in the House of Commons of the UK Parliament since 2010 by Guy Opperman, a Conservative. As with all constituencies, the constituency elects one Member of Parliament (MP) by the first past the post system of election at least every five years.

The seat was created as one of four single member divisions of the county of Northumberland under the Redistribution of Seats Act 1885.

Constituency profile
The second-largest constituency by land area in England (covering 250,992 hectares), Hexham reaches to the Pennines and is traversed by Hadrian's Wall, which runs almost due east–west through England. It includes substantial agricultural holdings, forestry, wood processing, food, minerals, and manufactured hardware industries. In the midst of the northwest of the constituency is Kielder Water; running between this area and the middle of the seat is the southern portion of Kielder Forest, and in the west, the attractions of the precipitous Haltwhistle Burn, Viaduct and Castle. SSE of Hexham is the Derwent Reservoir. As well as those rural areas, the constituency also includes part of Newcastle's middle-class suburbs.

Hexham has been held by the Conservative Party, and generally with safe majorities, since 1924. It was the only Conservative seat in the North East between the New Labour years in government from 1997-2010, and the only one in Northumberland from 1973 until the Conservatives gained Berwick-upon-Tweed from the Liberal Democrats in 2015. It was also the northernmost seat won by the Conservatives in 1997, in what would be their worst landslide defeat at any general election of the twentieth century; with all Conservative MPs in Scotland and Wales unseated that year. Despite this middle-class segment of the population, there are also some more working-class areas: Prudhoe frequently elects Labour councillors and has demographics similar to neighbouring parts of Blaydon, a safe Labour seat. There is also some deprivation in rural areas, particularly around Haltwhistle.

Based on the latest published old age dependency ratios, a slightly larger than average level of the population is retired. In 1997, the Labour Party was very close to winning the seat, but the Conservatives retained it with a significantly reduced narrow majority of 222 votes. Hexham is considered a safe seat for the Conservative Party, having been under their control for almost a century.

Boundaries

1885–1918: The Sessional Divisions of Bellingham, Coquetdale West, Haltwhistle, and Tynedale.

The contents of the county division were defined by the Redistribution of Seats Act 1885.

1918–1950: The Rural Districts of Bellingham, Haltwhistle, Hexham, and the part of the Rural District of Castle Ward which consists of the civil parishes of Bitchfield, Black Heddon, Capheaton, Cheeseburn Grange, East Matfen, Fenwick, Harlow Hill, Hawkwell, Heugh, Ingoe, Kearsley, Kirkheaton, Nesbitt, Ouston, Ryal, Wallridge and West Matfen, and the Urban Districts of Hexham and Prudhoe.

Rothbury was transferred to Berwick-upon-Tweed.

1950–1974: The Urban Districts of Hexham and Prudhoe, and the Rural Districts of Bellingham, Castle Ward, Haltwhistle, Hexham.

The remainder of Castle Ward was transferred from the abolished constituency of Wansbeck.

1974–1983: The urban districts of Hexham and Prudhoe, and the rural districts of Bellingham, Castle Ward, Haltwhistle, and Hexham.

The boundary with Blyth was slightly amended to take account of changes to local government boundaries.

1983–2010: The District of Tynedale, and the following wards of the Borough of Castle Morpeth: Heddon-on-the-Wall, Ponteland East, Ponteland North, Ponteland South, Ponteland West, Stamfordham, Stannington, and Whalton.

Contents changed following reorganisation of local authorities in 1974. The area of the former rural district of Castle Ward which was now part of the City of Newcastle upon Tyne in Tyne and Wear was now included Newcastle upon Tyne North.

2010–present: The District of Tynedale, and the following wards of the Borough of Castle Morpeth: Heddon-on-the-Wall, Ponteland East, Ponteland North, Ponteland South, Ponteland West, Stamfordham, and Stannington.

2007 boundary review 
In the fifth periodic boundary review of parliamentary representation in Northumberland, which came into effect for the 2010 general election, the contents of the existing Hexham constituency were unchanged except for losing the southern part of the Hartburn ward to Berwick-upon-Tweed, and the Boundary Commission for England made only minor changes in Northumberland to take account of ward boundary changes.

In 2009, a further government reorganisation resulted in the abolition of all local government boroughs and districts in Northumberland and the establishment of the county as a unitary authority. However, this has not affected the current constituency boundaries.

Members of Parliament 
Colonel Douglas Clifton Brown, who was Speaker of the House of Commons during the latter years of the World War II, represented the seat for two separate tenures (from 1918-23, and again from 1924-51).

Elections

Elections in the 2010s

Elections in the 2000s

Elections in the 1990s

Elections in the 1980s

Elections in the 1970s

Elections in the 1960s

Elections in the 1950s

Elections in the 1940s 

1943: Douglas Clifton-Brown becomes Speaker of the House of Commons.

Elections in the 1930s

Elections in the 1920s

Elections in the 1910s 

General Election 1914–15:

Another General Election was required to take place before the end of 1915. The political parties had been making preparations for an election to take place and by July 1914, the following candidates had been selected:
Liberal: Richard Durning Holt
Unionist: Alan Percy

Elections in the 1900s

Elections in the 1890s 

 Caused after the 1892 result was declared void on petition.

Clayton was unseated on petition

Elections in the 1880s

See also
List of parliamentary constituencies in Northumberland
History of parliamentary constituencies and boundaries in Northumberland

Notes

References
Specific

General
Craig, F. W. S. (1983). British parliamentary election results 1918–1949 (3 ed.). Chichester: Parliamentary Research Services. .

 

Parliamentary constituencies in Northumberland
Constituencies of the Parliament of the United Kingdom established in 1885